Peter Ceesay (born 18 February 1959) is a Gambian middle-distance runner. He competed in the men's 800 metres at the 1984 Summer Olympics.

References

1959 births
Living people
Athletes (track and field) at the 1984 Summer Olympics
Gambian male middle-distance runners
Olympic athletes of the Gambia
Place of birth missing (living people)